Epps may refer to:

People
 Anna Epps (born 1930), African-American microbiologist and medical school dean and CEO
 Archie Epps (1937–2003), African-American academic and dean of students at Harvard College
 Aubrey Epps (1912–1984), American Major League Baseball catcher
 Ben T. Epps (1888–1937), American pioneering aviator and airplane designer
 Bobby Epps (1932–2014), American football player
 Bubber Epps (born 1943), American politician
 Charles T. Epps Jr. (1944–2015), American politician
 Chris Epps (born 1961), U.S. state department of corrections commissioner
 Christina Epps (born 1991), American triple jumper
 Dedrick Epps (born 1988), American former National Football League tight end
 Edwin Epps, American cotton planter and slave owner of kidnapped free black Solomon Northup (1807/08–c. 1863), whose ordeal is detailed in the memoir Twelve Years a Slave
 Garrett Epps, American law professor, novelist and journalist
 George Epps (actuary) (1885–1951), British civil servant and actuary
 George Napoleon Epps (1815–1874), English homœopath and author, half-brother of John Epps
 Hal Epps (1914–2004), American Major League Baseball outfielder
 Jack Epps Jr. (born 1949), American screenwriter
 Jeanette Epps (born 1970), NASA astronaut
 JoAnne A. Epps, American law professor, author and Executive Vice President and Provost of Temple University
 John Epps (1805–1869), English physician, phrenologist, homeopath and political activist
 Joseph L. Epps (1870–1952), United States Army private who received the Medal of Honor
 Makayla Epps (born 1995), American women's basketball guard
 Marcus Epps (disambiguation), various people
 Mike Epps (born 1970), American actor and comedian
 Omar Epps (born 1973), American actor
 Orlo Epps (1864–1926), American architect, mathematician, physicist and socialist
 Phil Epps (born 1959), American former National Football League wide receiver
 Preston Epps (born 1931), American percussionist
 Roselyn P. Epps (died 2014), American pediatrician and first African-American president of the American Medical Women's Association
 Shareeka Epps (born 1989), American actress
 Sheldon Epps (born 1952), American television and theater director
 Stuart Epps, British record producer and audio engineer
 Tauheed Epps (born 1977), American rapper known professionally as 2 Chainz
 Tory Epps (1967–2005), American football player
 W. Epps,  English cricket writer and historian in the late 18th century

Places in the United States
 Epps, Louisiana, a village
 Epps Township, Butler County, Missouri

Other
 HEPPS (molecule) (or EPPS), common names for the compound 3-[4-(2-Hydroxyethyl)-1-piperazinyl]propanesulfonic acid
 Edwards Personal Preference Schedule
 Energetic Particle and Plasma Spectrometer, an instrument aboard MESSENGER space probe that measures the charged particles in the magnetosphere around Mercury
 Epps effect, in econometrics and time series analysis, the phenomenon that the empirical correlation between the returns of two different stocks decreases as the sampling frequency of data increases
 Epps 1907 Monoplane, a pioneering aircraft built and flown in 1907 by Ben T. Epps
 Half-Sack Epps, a fictional character on the TV series Sons of Anarchy